Cermatulus nasalis is a species of predatory shield bug in the family Pentatomidae. It is commonly known as the brown soldier bug or glossy shield bug and is native to Australia and New Zealand.

Subspecies
Three subspecies are recognised :
C. nasalis hudsoni Woodward 1953
C. nasalis nasalis (Westwood, 1837)
C. nasalis turbotti Woodward 1950

Description

The head is brown and has a bluntly rounded snout. The prothorax is broadly triangular and marked with fine perforations, the colour being some shade of yellowish-, orangeish- or rusty-brown with blackish markings and fine brownish-black punctuations. The dorsal surface of the abdomen is black and the ventral surface a mottled yellowish-brown. The forewings are mainly brown, each having a large black triangular patch on the posterior part. The antennae and legs are yellowish-brown.

Ecology
Cermatulus nasalis is predatory and feeds on a variety of insect species, plunging its beak into its prey and sucking out the body fluids. There is just one generation each year, breeding taking place over a period of several weeks during the summer. The female lays a batch of about thirty black eggs in three neat rows, on a leaf or patch of bark. The newly hatched nymphs are red with black heads and feed at first on the bacteria that coat the eggs, and also on plant sap. They moult five times, each instar having a different pattern of red and black markings. From the second instar onwards they are predators and feed on caterpillars and other insects with soft bodies.

References

Asopinae
Insects described in 1837
Hemiptera of Australia
Hemiptera of New Zealand